The Bangladesh Freedom Party is a party founded by Captain Khandaker Abdur Rashid, Colonel Syed Faruque Rahman and Major Bazlul Huda, the chief conspirators of the killing of Sheikh Mujibur Rahman on 15 August 1975.

1989 Assassination plot
On 10 August 1989, activists and leaders of Freedom Party allegedly launched an attack at Sheikh Hasina's the then residence in Dhanmondi's Road 32.

Freedom Party members Kajol and Kobir with 10-12 men attacked Hasina's residence by hurling bomb and firing gunshots, the case statement read.

They chanted the slogan “Farukh-Rashid Jindabad” as they left the place.

Following the incident, Zahurul Islam, a security guard of the residence, filed two cases—one for plotting to kill Hasina and other for hurling bomb—with Dhanmondi Police Station.

In 1997, eight years after the attack, Criminal Investigation Department's (CID) pressed charges against 19 people including Freedom Party leaders and Bangabandhu Sheikh Mujibur Rahman's murderers Lt Col (retd) Syed Farukul Islam, Lt Col (retd) Abdur Rashid and Maj (retd) Bazlul Huda in an attempted murder and another explosive case.

On 5 July 2009, charges were framed against 16 accused.

Four of the accused – Sohel alias Freedom Sohel, Golam Sarwar Mamun, Joj Miah and Syed Nazmul Maksud Murad – are currently in jail. Four accused – Humayun Kabir, Mizanur Rahman, Khandokar Amirul Islam and Md Shahjahan alias Balu – had been freed on bail.

Two others—Zafar Ahmed and H Kabir—are absconding while two of the accused – Gazi Liakat Hossain and Rezaul Islam Khan – died earlier.

Syed Faruk and Bazlul Huda have been executed in the Bangabandhu murder case.

1990- present
On 11 February 1990, activists of the Freedom Party attacked a Bangladesh Awami League rally killing Harun-ur-Rashid and injuring others. The party, according to 1997 UNHRC report, kept a low profile.

According to the Bangladesh Police, from 2000 onward, Mehnaz Rashid, daughter of Khandaker Abdur Rashid, had been involved in reorganizing Freedom Party. She contested the parliamentary polls in 2001 and 2008 from Chandina of Comilla on Freedom Party ticket.

In 2009, Mehnaz Rashid was arrested by police, along with  Kamrul Haque Swapan, younger brother of Major Sharful Haq Dalim for suspected links to a bomb attack on Awami League lawmaker Fazle Noor Taposh.

The party's current chairman is Colonel Faruque's son Syed Tariq Rahman, who lives in Sydney.

References

 
Political parties in Bangladesh
Political parties with year of establishment missing